Thomas Blake, Jr. (born December 29, 1976) is an American former professional tennis player. Blake was born in Yonkers, New York to Thomas Sr. (who is African-American) and Betty (who is English). He has a younger brother, James Blake, who was also a professional tennis player, as well as three half-brothers, Jason, Howard and Christopher, and a half-sister, Michelle.

Blake grew up in Fairfield, Connecticut and attended Fairfield Warde High School. A graduate of Harvard University, he became a professional tennis player in 1996. He competed in the US Open doubles in 1999 and 2002, both times partnering his brother James. He has played on the ATP Tour, appearing in such tournaments as the U.S. Men's Clay Court Championships and Legg Mason Tennis Classic, both in 2003. He currently resides in Tampa, Florida.

Blake retired from professional singles tennis in October 2005.

In June 2008 Thomas Blake was announced as head coach of the Washington Kastles.

References
 Washington Kastles

External links

1976 births
African-American male tennis players
American male tennis players
American people of English descent
Harvard Crimson men's tennis players
Living people
Sportspeople from Fairfield, Connecticut
Sportspeople from Yonkers, New York
Tennis people from Connecticut
Tennis people from Florida
Tennis people from New York (state)
21st-century African-American sportspeople
20th-century African-American sportspeople